John Nu'uma'ali'i (born 21 May 1985) is an Australian former professional rugby league footballer who played for the Penrith Panthers.

References

External links
Penrith Panthers profile

1985 births
Living people
Australian rugby league players
Australian sportspeople of Samoan descent
Penrith Panthers players
Rugby league locks
Rugby league second-rows
Rugby league players from Sydney
Windsor Wolves players